York is a city in North Yorkshire, England, and the historical capital of Yorkshire.

York or Yorke may also refer to:

Places
City of York (disambiguation)
Little York (disambiguation)
New York (disambiguation)
North York (disambiguation)
West York (disambiguation)
York Airport (disambiguation)
York County (disambiguation)
Yorktown (disambiguation)
York Township (disambiguation)

Australia
Cape York Peninsula, Queensland
York, Western Australia
Yorke Peninsula (disambiguation), articles concerning Yorke Peninsula in South Australia
York Plains, Tasmania

Canada

York, Edmonton, Alberta
Ontario:
Regional Municipality of York, also known as York Region
York, Ontario, a district of Toronto and former municipality. See also East York and North York
 York County, Ontario, a former county in Ontario
York, Upper Canada, former name of Toronto before 1834
 York, Haldimand County, Ontario

York River (Ontario)
York, Prince Edward Island 
Quebec:
Zec de la Rivière-York
York River (Quebec) — See Gaspé, Quebec

England 
City of York, a local government district of North Yorkshire
County of York, alternative name for Yorkshire
York (European Parliament constituency)
York, Lancashire, a hamlet

Greenland
Cape York, Greenland

Sierra Leone
York, Sierra Leone

United States
York, Alabama
York, Alaska
York Mountain AVA, California wine region
York, Georgia
York, Illinois
York, Indiana
Maine:
York, Maine
York Beach, Maine
York Harbor, Maine
York River (Maine)
York Charter Township, Michigan
York, Missouri
York, Montana
York, Nebraska
New York:
New York (state)
New York City
York, New York
York, North Dakota
York, Jefferson County, Ohio
York, Sandusky County, Ohio
Pennsylvania:
York, Pennsylvania
York Springs, Pennsylvania
York Haven, Pennsylvania
York, South Carolina
York River (Virginia)
Wisconsin:
York, Clark County, Wisconsin
York, Dane County, Wisconsin
York, Green County, Wisconsin
York, Jackson County, Wisconsin
York Center, Wisconsin

Educational institutions
York College (disambiguation)
York High School (disambiguation)

Canada
York University, Toronto
York Region District School Board
York Catholic District School Board

England
University of York
York College (York)
York St John University

United States
York School (California), Monterey, California
York Technical College, Rock Hill, South Carolina
York Community High School, Elmhurst, Illinois
York County Community College, Wells, Maine
York College of Pennsylvania, York, Pennsylvania

Music
York (group), a German dance music project
York (album), by American rapper Blu
York (First Exit to Brooklyn), an album by The Foetus Symphony Orchestra

People
York (explorer), an enslaved African-American member of the Lewis and Clark Expedition Corps of Discovery
Yorke (musician), Australian musician, singer and songwriter
Archbishop of York, the junior of the two archbishops of the Church of England
Duke of York, a title held by various members of the British Royal Family through English history
House of York, a dynasty of English kings in the 15th century
York (surname), a surname (including a list of people with the name)
Yorke (surname), a surname (including a list of people with the name)

Other uses
Avro York, a British transport plane of the 1940s
HMS York, several warships of the British Royal Navy
HP Yorke, a microprocessor
York City F.C., an association football club
York City Knights (2003-), a rugby league football club
York Wasps (1868-2002), a defunct rugby league football club
York Civil, an Australian engineering and construction company founded in 1990
York Imperial, an apple cultivar
York International, a manufacturer HVAC equipment
York Fitness, a manufacturer of fitness products
York Peppermint Pattie, a US candy
York Rite, a branch of freemasonry
York United FC, an association football club

See also

Jork, town near Hamburg, Germany
Jórvík, the Viking Kingdom of York
Yorker